Murray Herbert Tobias,  (born 1939) was a retired Australian jurist who served as a judge of the Court of Appeal of the Supreme Court of New South Wales between 28 April 2003 and 25 March 2011.

Education
Tobias studied at The Scots College, Sydney. He graduated in law from the University of Sydney, and subsequently attained a BCL from the University of Oxford.

Career
Tobias was appointed Queen's Counsel in 1978. From 1993–95, Tobias was President of the NSW Bar Association.

In 2003, Tobias was appointed a Judge of Appeal of the NSW Court of Appeal and retired in March, 2011.  He continued to serve as an Acting Judge in Appeal until March 2016.

Tobias was also a member of the Royal Australian Navy Reserve Legal Panel from 1968, retiring as Head of Panel when he turned 60 with the rank of captain.  At the time of his retirement he was a Judge Advocate and a Defence Force Magistrate.

Tobias was made a Member of the Order of Australia in the 1998 Australia Day Honours for "service to the legal profession, particularly through the New South Wales and Australian Bar Associations, and to military law".

References

1939 births
Alumni of Exeter College, Oxford
Australian King's Counsel
Judges of the Supreme Court of New South Wales
Living people
Members of the Order of Australia
Sydney Law School alumni